Dehsur-e Sofla (also Romanized as Dehsūr-e Soflá; also known as Deh Soor, Deh Sūr, and Dehsūr-e Pā’īn) is a village in Barf Anbar Rural District, in the Central District of Fereydunshahr County, Isfahan Province, Iran. At the 2006 census, its population was 397, in 96 families.

References 

Populated places in Fereydunshahr County